Sŏnjuk Bridge is a Koryo-dynasty stone bridge located in Kaesong, North Korea. Built in 1290, it is famous as the place where famed Confucian scholar and statesman Jeong Mong-ju was assassinated, allegedly on the orders of the Yi Bang-won, son of the first king of the Joseon Dynasty, Yi Seong-gye. The bridge was closed to all traffic in 1780 and has since been a national monument. It is 8.35m long and 3.36m wide. It was originally named the Sonji Bridge, but was renamed Sonjuk Bridge after the assassination of Mong-ju because bamboo grew where he was killed (juk being the Korean word for bamboo).

Assassination of Jeong Mongju
A famously loyal advisor to the king of Goryeo, Jeong was a staunch political opponent of Yi Seonggye. On his way home after a party held for him by the future king, he was ambushed by five men on the bridge and brutally murdered with an iron hammer. Later canonized as a Korean sage, and revered even by Joseon monarchs, Jeong's death came to symbolize unwavering loyalty. A brown spot on one of the stones is said to be Jong's bloodstain, and to become red when it rains. A famous poem of his records his final thoughts:

Even if I may die, die a hundred times, 
Even if my skeleton may become dust and dirt, 
And whether my spirit may be there or not, 
My single-hearted loyalty to my lord will not change.

Pyochung Pavilion
Built during the Joseon dynasty, this small wooden structure houses two enormous stone stele mounted on the backs of lion-turtles, one erected in 1740 by King Yeongjo and the other by King Gojong in 1872. Both commemorate Jeong Mongju's assassination, and praise his loyalty to the Goryeo dynasty.

See also
 National Treasures of North Korea

References 

Kaesong
National Treasures of North Korea
World Heritage Sites in North Korea
Historic Monuments and Sites in Kaesong